Rubigula is a genus of Asian passerine birds in the bulbul family, Pycnonotidae.

Taxonomy
The genus Rubigula was introduced in 1845 by the English zoologist Edward Blyth. The type species was designated as the ruby-throated bulbul by George Robert Gray in 1855. The name combines the Medieval Latin rubinus meaning "ruby" with Latin gula meaning "throat".

This genus was formerly synonymized with the genus Pycnonotus. A molecular phylogenetic study of the bulbul family published in 2017 found that Pycnonotus was polyphyletic. In the revision to the generic classification five species were moved from Pycnonotus to Rubigula.

Species
It has five species:

References

Rubigula
Taxa named by Edward Blyth